Missick is a surname. Notable people with the surname include:

Akierra Missick (born 1983), Turks and Caicos Islands lawyer and politician
Dorian Missick (born 1976), American actor
Rosita Beatrice Missick-Butterfield (1936–2015), Turks and Caicos Islands politician
Simone Missick (born 1982), American film and television actress

See also
Misick